Georges Haddad (14 March 1924, in Beit Chabad, Lebanon – 30 December 1985) was Archbishop of the Melkite Greek Catholic Archeparchy of Tyre in Lebanon.

Priest

Having entered the Seminary of Saint Anne in Rabweh in 1935, he finished his studies there and was ordained to the priesthood at the Melkite diocese in Beirut on 26 June 1948. Subsequently, Haddad filled a teaching post, became secretary at the Archbishopric of Beirut and pastor at the parish of Saint John Chrysostom.

Archbishop

On 30 July 1965, Haddad was appointed as Archbishop of Tyre, succeeding Archbishop Agapios Salomon Naoum. The Patriarch of Antioch Maximos IV Sayegh ordained him to this office, assisted by the co-consecrators Archbishop Basile Khoury of Sidon in Lebanon and Archbishop Mikhayl Assaf of Petra and Philadelphia in Amman, Jordan. At the end of the same year, Haddad participated as a council father in the last session of the Second Vatican Council.

In the ten years before the outbreak of the Lebanese Civil War (1975-1990), Haddad had a new seat of the archeparchy constructed and the historical Cathedral of Saint Thomas repaired. At the same time, he developed close relations with the Shia leader Sayyed Musa Sadr.

When Israel's invasion of Lebanon started on 6 June 1982, Haddad reportedly succeeded in temporarily halting the attack of an Israeli Defense Forces (IDF) tank column in a bold appeal to its commander, mediated by a Swiss delegate of the International Committee of the Red Cross (ICRC), to evacuate the civilian population to the beaches. Hence, he was widely praised as "a model ecumenical pastor, maintaining cordial human relations with all, and especially with the most needy, without any discrimination whatsoever."
During his tenure, Haddad was co-consecrator of:

 Archbishop Boutros Raï, auxiliary bishop in Antioch and Titular Archbishop of Edessa in Osrhoene of Greek Melkites,
 Archbishop Maximos Salloum of Acre,
 Bishop Michel Hakim of Sidon,
 Bishop Spiridon Mattar of São Paulo.

"He died 30th December 1985, after a long and painful illness which had come upon him suddenly and which he bore with loving resignation to the will of the lord."His successor became Jean Assaad Haddad.

References

External links
 http://www.catholic-hierarchy.org/bishop/bhaddadg.html

1924 births
1985 deaths
Lebanese Melkite Greek Catholics
Melkite Greek Catholic bishops